Green's Northern Coaches was an Australian bus company operating services in Wollongong.

History
In August 1973, Rod Green purchased route 2 Wollongong - Stanwell Park from Hill's Bus Service with six buses. On 1 January 1992, the Helensburgh Bus Service business was purchased from Colin Crossley with route 15 Helensburgh - Stanwell Park with five buses. In February 2015, the business was sold to the Premier Transport Group and rebranded Premier Charters.

Services
From 2008 until February 2015, Green's services were part of Sydney Outer Metropolitan Bus Region 9. 

Green's operated 2 routes in the northern suburbs of Wollongong and the southern part of the Royal National Park:
2: Stanwell Park - Wollongong
15: Helensburgh station - Stanwell Park

Fleet
As at February 2015, the fleet consisted of 18 buses and coaches. The fleet livery was green and white. In 2011, the Transport for NSW white and blue livery was adopted for route buses.

Depots
Green's operated depots in Helensburgh and Thirroul.

References

External links
Company website

Bus companies of New South Wales
Wollongong
Transport companies established in 1973
Transport companies disestablished in 2015
2015 disestablishments in Australia
Australian companies established in 1973
Defunct bus companies of Australia